Brazosport High School is a public high school located at the intersection of Brazosport Boulevard and West 2nd Street in Freeport, Texas, United States. It handles grades nine through twelve and is part of the Brazosport Independent School District.

The high school serves the following: Freeport, as well as surrounding Jones Creek, Oyster Creek, Quintana, and Surfside Beach. The campus recently received major renovations, removing the majority of the original campus.

Athletics
Brazosport High School is often nicknamed "B-Port" by its students.  Athletic teams are known as the "Exporters" and sport the colors red, white and blue. The Exporters have earned two high school baseball state 4A championships (1964 and 1966). The Exporter football team plays their home games at Hopper Field located on-campus.

Brazosport High School is most known for their winter extracurricular activities, and offers Colorguard, Winterguard, The Shipmates Drill Team, Exporter Band, Orchestra, Sports, Academic Team, NHS, Student Council, Anime Club, FFA, and Debate Club.

The Brazosport Exporters compete in these sports - 

Baseball
Basketball
Cross Country
Football
Golf
Powerlifting
Soccer
Softball
Swimming and Diving
Tennis
Track and Field
Volleyball

History
The high school was originally the only one in the area before Brazoswood High School opened in September 1969 to serve the communities of Clute, Lake Jackson, and Richwood in the Brazosport Independent School District (BISD). The opening of Brazoswood High School created an immediate rivalry between the two schools that is still alive today.

Feeder patterns 
Freeport Elementary feeds into Velasco Elementary. Velasco feeds into Lanier Middle. Lanier Middle and SFA Stem Academy feed into Freeport Intermediate. Freeport Intermediate feeds into Brazosport.

Academics
In 2007 Johns Hopkins University referred to Brazosport as a "dropout factory" where at least 40 percent of the entering freshman class does not make it to their senior year.

See also
 Hopper Field - The Brazosport ISD stadium

Notable alumni
Fred Beene
Bo Burris
King Hill
Cedric Mack
Ray Waddy
Alan Weddell
Melvin White

References

External links 
 Brazosport High School
 Brazosport ISD Twitter
 Brazosport High School Twitter

Freeport, Texas
Brazosport Independent School District high schools